The 1989–90 New Jersey Devils season was the 16th season for the National Hockey League franchise that was established on June 11, 1974, and eighth season since the franchise relocated from Colorado prior to the 1982–83 NHL season. The season saw the Devils make the playoffs for the second time and only the third time in franchise history. The Devils were eliminated in the first round by the Washington Capitals.

Regular season

Season standings

Schedule and results

Playoffs

Patrick Division Semifinals

(P2) New Jersey Devils vs. (P3) Washington Capitals 

The first two games took place at the Meadowlands in New Jersey. In Game 1, Washington beat New Jersey 5-4 in overtime. In Game 2, the Devils won 6-5. Games 3 and 4 took place at Capital Centre. The Devils were victorious in Game 3 2-1, but their series lead was abruptly halted by the Capitals in game 4 when they won 3-1. Game 5 went back to New Jersey, and the Capitals took a 4-3 win. Game 6 was back at  Capital Centre where the Capitals took a 3-2 win over the Devils and won the series 4-2.

Player statistics

Regular season
Scoring

Goaltending

Playoffs
Scoring

Goaltending

Note: GP = Games played; G = Goals; A = Assists; Pts = Points; +/- = Plus/minus; PIM = Penalty minutes; PPG = Power-play goals; SHG = Short-handed goals; GWG = Game-winning goals
      MIN = Minutes played; W = Wins; L = Losses; T = Ties; GA = Goals against; GAA = Goals against average; SO = Shutouts; SA = Shots against; SV = Shots saved; SV% = Save percentage;

Draft picks
The Devils' draft picks at the 1989 NHL Entry Draft.

See also
1989–90 NHL season

Notes

References

New Jersey Devils seasons
New Jersey Devils
New Jersey Devils
New Jersey Devils
New Jersey Devils
20th century in East Rutherford, New Jersey
Meadowlands Sports Complex